Manniella cypripedioides is a species of plant in the family Orchidaceae. It is found in Cameroon and Equatorial Guinea. Its natural habitat is subtropical or tropical moist lowland forests. It is threatened by habitat loss.

References 

cypripedioides
Endangered plants
Orchids of Cameroon
Orchids of Equatorial Guinea
Taxonomy articles created by Polbot